The term right-wing alternative media in the United States usually refers to internet, talk radio, print, and television journalism. They are defined by their presentation of opinions from a conservative or right wing point of view and politicized reporting as a counter to what they describe as a liberal bias of mainstream media.

History

Before the 1960s 

During this time, some prominent mainstream newspapers were conservative. William Randolph Hearst, longtime Progressive Democrat, turned increasingly conservative since the 1920s. He initially supported President Franklin D. Roosevelt's New Deal, but broke with him after 1934. Since then, the Hearst chain newspapers opposed the New Deal. Among other prominent newspapers, Los Angeles Times remained staunchly conservative until 1952. During the 1960s, it turned decisively liberal. McCormick family newspapers (particularly the Chicago Tribune) remained staunchly conservative until the late 1960s, as were the Henry Luce magazines like Time and Fortune. By 1936, most newspapers opposed the New Deal. In that year, newspapers in the largest 15 metropolitan cities with 70% circulation supported the Republican candidate Alf Landon against FDR.

At the same time, conservative activists began to found their own magazines to counter alleged liberal bias in mainstream media, and to propagate conservative point of view. Human Events was founded in 1944 by The Washington Post former editor Felix Morley and publisher Henry Regnery. Libertarian, pro-free market journal The Freeman was founded in 1950 by journalists John Chamberlain, Henry Hazlitt, and Suzanne La Follette. Many conservative intellectuals were associated with it, who later joined the National Review.

In 1955, National Review was founded by the author and journalist William F. Buckley Jr. Its publisher was William A. Rusher. Since its inception, National Review became the beacon of post-war conservative movement. Buckley drew conservative (particularly ex-communist) intellectuals to the magazine, including Russell Kirk, Frank Meyer, Whittaker Chambers, L. Brent Bozell Jr., John Dos Passos, James Burnham, and William Schlamm. Meyer formed the new thesis of fusionism, which included a fusion of traditionalism, libertarianism, and anti-communism. This became the guiding philosophy of the New Right.

These decades also saw the emergence of conservative talk radio, though their outreach was limited than that of recent decades, due to the Fairness Doctrine. Among pioneering conservative talk radio hosts were Fulton Lewis, Paul Harvey, Bob Grant, Alan Burke, and Clarence Manion, former dean of the Notre Dame Law School.

1960s to 1980s 

Not long after this, then Vice President Spiro Agnew began attacking the media in a series of speeches — two of the most famous of these were written by White House aides Patrick Buchanan and William Safire — as "elitist" and "liberal".

After Nixon's resignation and until the late 1980s, overtly conservative news outlets included the editorial pages of The Wall Street Journal, the Chicago Tribune, the New York Post and The Washington Times. Conservative magazines included the National Review, The Weekly Standard and the American Spectator.

Fairness doctrine

Contemporary right-wing media
Journalist Ezra Klein describes right-wing media in the late 20th and early 21st century as evolving and growing in influence: 
First came Rush Limbaugh and his imitators on talk radio, then Fox News (and eventually its imitators and competitors, like OANN), and then the blogs, and then digitally native outlets like Breitbart and the Daily Wire. 

Right-wing media represented and was nurtured by the party’s grass-roots base -- as opposed to "the donor class" or "the Chamber of Commerce wing" of the Republican Party (such as the Koch network).  Nicole Hemmer describes the Republican Party as having "outsourced" its media to the right-wing media just as “it outsourced funding to PACS”. American right-wing "media ecosystem" became characterized by ruthless competition -- if one outlet lost "touch with what the audience actually cares about", that audience would move on "to another show, another station, another site".

The new media was the place where grass-roots discontent with "the Republican Party’s leadership or agenda could be turned against the party’s elite", and where party rebel candidates could raise money "even after they alienated their colleagues and repelled the Koch class", (and example being  Marjorie Taylor Greene, who was one of the 10 top fund-raisers in the House of Representatives in the 2022 election cycle.

Talk radio

With the increased popularity and superior sound quality of FM radio, AM stations had long languished behind FM in both popularity and ratings, resulting in underutilization of the band. There had even been discussions in the 1970s and 1980s of abolishing the AM band.

The combination of underutilized AM frequencies and the absence of content restrictions led a number of radio programmers and syndicators to produce and broadcast conservative talk shows. Notable examples are Rush Limbaugh, Hugh Hewitt, Michael Medved, Michael Savage, Sean Hannity and Glenn Beck. These talk shows draw large audiences and have arguably altered the political landscape.  Talk radio became a key force in the 2000 and 2004 presidential elections.
While some liberal talk radio also emerged, such as Pacifica Radio's Democracy Now! and the ersatz Air America Radio, most liberal voices have moved to the Internet, leaving broadcast radio still dominated by conservatives.

Blogs
In the early 2000s, blogs of all political persuasions became increasingly influential.  Conservative blogs such as Power Line, Captains Quarters and blogger Michelle Malkin covered and promoted a number of stories, for instance the Swift Boat Veterans' criticism of the war record of presidential candidate John Kerry. Particularly notable was the uncovering of the "Memogate" scandal by Little Green Footballs and others.  American blog Captains Quarters played a role in the 2004 Canadian election, outflanking a Canadian judicial gag order on media coverage of hearings related to a Canadian Liberal Party corruption scandal.  The fallout from the scandal helped lead to a Conservative victory in the following election.

2010s 
In October 2020, describing the ascendancy of alternative media on the right of American politics during the late 2010s, journalist Ben Smith wrote:
There was also an emergence of state-specific right-wing alternative media news websites that emerged in the decade such as The Tennessee Star, New Boston Post, and others.

See also

Alternative media (U.S. political left)

References

Further reading

Alternative media